The Saks Fifth Avenue store building is a department store located within the Golden Triangle business district of Beverly Hills, California. It has housed a Saks Fifth Avenue department store since its completion in 1938. It is the third-highest performing location in the company, behind the flagship store in New York City and the location in Atlanta and is operated as a second flagship store by parent Hudson's Bay Company.

Architecture 
It was designed by the architectural firm Parkinson and Parkinson, with interiors by Paul R. Williams. The store opened in 1938. The exterior of the building was designed by the Parkinsons, with the interior completed by Williams in the Hollywood Regency style. David Gebhard and Robert Winter, writing in Los Angeles: An Architectural Guide described the building as having "enough curved surface to suggest that the thirties Streamline Moderne could be elegant". The store was expanded and redesigned by Williams in 1940 and 1948. The store was immediately successful upon opening and it would subsequently expand to almost  and employ 500 people.

Williams's designs for the store marked a departure from traditional department stores by reducing the emphasis on commerciality that foresaw the rise of boutique stores in the 1980s and 1990s. Only a few examples of merchandise were displayed in hidden recesses. The President of Saks Fifth Avenue, Adam Gimbel, said in an interview with the Los Angeles Times that "Each room attempts to create a mood which is in keeping with the merchandise sold there. For example, a Pompeian room done in cool green with appropriate frieze is used for beach and swimming pool costumes and a French provincial room houses informal sports and country clothes The accessories are carried in an oval room done in a Regency spirit".

The individual shipping areas of the store were semi-enclosed which prevented distraction for customers. Williams created an interior reminiscences of his designs for luxurious private residences, with rooms lit by indirect lamps and footlights focused on the clothes. New departments for furs, corsets, gifts and debutante dresses were added in the 1940 expansion.

The Terrace Restaurant, a rooftop restaurant run by Perino's, served customers for several years. It was expanded in the 1940s renovations to provide cover during inclement weather.

Men's store 
Saks operates a The Mens Store in an adjacent building at 9634 Wilshire Boulevard.

2020s redevelopment 
In June 2022, Hudson's Bay Company announced plans to convert the 9600 Wilshire Boulevard building into a mixed-use development with office, retail, and residential components. By 2023, Saks Fifth Avenue is expected to be relocated into the adjacent 9570 Wilshire Boulevard storefront, which was left vacant by the defunct Barneys New York since February 2020.

In popular culture 
The store featured in the 2005 film Shopgirl. The story had originally been set in Neiman Marcus but Saks Fifth Avenue lobbied the film makers to portray their store instead.

References

External links 
 

Beverly Hills, California
Commercial buildings completed in 1938
Historic department store buildings in the United States
Paul Williams (architect) buildings
Retail buildings in California
Streamline Moderne architecture in California
Wilshire Boulevard
1938 establishments in California